Puy du Fou España is a Spanish historical theme park opened in 2021 and located in Toledo, in the autonomous community of Castile-La Mancha. The park is part of the French group Association du Puy du Fou.

References

Amusement parks in Spain
2021 establishments in Spain
Amusement parks opened in 2021
Toledo, Spain